Sivasakthi Movie Makers is an Indian film production and distribution company headed by Sivasakthi Pandian. The film had been a leading production studio in the Tamil film industry in the 1990s, but has struggled following the switch to digital film-making. The studio has made eleven films, all of which have music composed by Deva.

History 
Beginning his career as a film distributor and exhibitor owning the Sivasakthi Cinema in Padi in Chennai. Sivasakthi Pandian eventually moved into production. He used the profits he had made from distributing Muthu (1995) to finance his debut film Vaanmathi (1996) starring Ajith and directed by Agathiyan. Vaanmathi became successful which prompted Pandian to collaborate with actor, director and crew of Vaanmathi for Kadhal Kottai (1996) which became a blockbuster and remains a cult-classic.

Following the release of director Agathiyan's Kadhal Kottai (1996), aspiring director R. Balu claimed that Agathiyan had stolen the story of the film from his half-complete venture Un Ninaivaaga. To appease Balu, producer Sivasakthi Pandian offered him the chance to make a film for the studio. Balu subsequently made his directorial debut with the romantic film Kaalamellam Kadhal Vaazhga (1997), featuring Murali and newcomer Kausalya in the leading roles and won critical acclaim for his first venture. A reviewer from Indolink.com stated that "overall, if it is a long time since you saw a movie with good comedy, above average music and crystal clear photography, here is one for you." Murali later played tribute to the studio for giving him several successful films.

In 2000, two films that the studio produced — Vetri Kodi Kattu and Kadal Pookkal — won National Film Awards. Pandian considered making a religious film Arupadai Veedu on the deity Murugan soon after, featuring Murali and Devayani, but the venture did not materialise. Similarly, a project by G. S. Krishnan titled Naagaa planned with Prashanth was also dropped soon after its announcement.

The studio effectively collapsed during the production of its twelfth film, Arjunan Kadhali starring Jai and Poorna. The film started production in 2008 and progressed slowly and by December 2010, Jai revealed he had finished his portions for the film. Despite finishing production, the film was delayed by distributor Ayngaran International's financial problems and has since remained unreleased. In February 2013, Sivasakthi Pandian was able to censor the film, while the music of the film was released two months later. In 2015, Cheran took up responsibility of releasing the film through his new straight-to-DVD platform of C2H, but the failure of the venture meant that the release of Arjunan Kadhali was delayed.

Following the studio's slowdown, Pandian has taken up roles including a post at the Tamil Film Producers Council, and as a censor board member.

Filmography

References 

Film distributors of India
Film production companies based in Chennai
Indian film studios
1996 establishments in Tamil Nadu
Mass media companies established in 1996
Indian companies established in 1996